is a mountain located in the Akaishi Mountains on the border between, Yamanashi and Nagano Prefectures in Japan.

Outline 
This area is in Minami Alps National Park that was established on June 1, 1964. This mountain is also one of the "200 Famous Japanese Mountains". There is no general mountain climbing trail. Therefore, it is difficult to climb it. There is the shelter Mountain hut ("6th Stone-Hut") between this mountain and Mount Kaikoma. The original hut was rebuilt in 2006.

Geography

Nearby Mountains 
It is on the main ridge line in the northern edge of the Akaishi Mountains.

River of source 
Mount Nokogiri is the source of the Fuji River. The Rivers of the source flow to the Pacific Ocean.
 Fuji River
 Todai River (Tributary of Tenryū River)

Gallery

See also 
 Akaishi Mountains
 Minami Alps National Park

References

External links 
 Geographical Survey Institute

Akaishi Mountains
Japan Alps
Mountains of Yamanashi Prefecture
Mountains of Nagano Prefecture
Minami Alps National Park